Hockey Central is the brand used for programs and segments covering hockey (particularly the National Hockey League) on the Canadian sports channel Sportsnet. The Hockey Central name encompasses several programs, including segments aired during Sportsnet Central, pre-game reports for Hockey Night in Canada and other NHL telecasts on Sportsnet, CBC, Citytv, and the Sportsnet 590 radio show Hockey Central at Noon.

Overview

Format
The typical format of Hockey Central'''s segments during Sportsnet Central and the Saturday show is a four-person panel of former NHL players, coaches, and GMs alongside hockey reporters and broadcasters. The members of the panel vary from day to day, but are usually from the same small pool of regulars. The show is known for (and often promotes) its sometimes fiery debates between Bill Watters and Nick Kypreos.

In the summer of 2006, host Darren Dreger left Sportsnet to join TSN and in 2018, Daren Millard left the network, and in 2021, Jeff Marek moved to an NHL insider role. Caroline Cameron and David Amber are the current hosts of most of the Hockey Central segments appearing on Sportsnet.

As of Rogers' 2014-15 rights deal, Hockey Central Saturday replaced Scotiabank Hockey Tonight as the pre-game show for Hockey Night in Canada, airing in simulcast with Sportsnet and CBC Television.

During the 2013 Stanley Cup Playoffs, The Score (after its purchase by Rogers) aired a nightly Hockey Central Playoff Xtra.

 Radio versions 
Sportsnet's radio stations also air hockey-oriented programs under the same or similar titles, often with a focus on news and analysis relating to their local teams.

 Hockey Central on CJCL 
Rogers' Toronto radio station CJCL broadcasts a radio version of the show, initially known as Hockey Central at Noon, which is simulcast by Sportsnet 360. It is currently hosted by Jeff Marek and features Anthony Stewart as an analyst. David Amber fills in for Marek on Wednesdays.

The program was originally hosted by Daren Millard. Between August 2010 and March 2011, it was hosted by Greg Brady, who worked the noon to 3pm shift. In March 2011, Brady was reassigned to the morning show and Millard returned as host. Jeff Marek replaced Daren Millard as host in 2018. When Brady was unable to host Hockey Central at Noon, Doug Farraway served as fill-in host. During the summer (from mid-June until September) during Millard's first hosting stint, Farraway took over the hosting duties from him, with Howard Berger serving as fill-in for Farraway.

In October 2019 as part of changes to CJCL's lineup, the program expanded to two hours.

The program has a national focus; CJCL airs a Toronto Maple Leafs-focused program immediately before Hockey Central, the Leafs Hour, with Ben Ennis and JD Bunkis.

 Hockey Central 960 
CFAC in Calgary broadcasts Hockey Central 960, which is hosted by Kelly Kirch and Peter Klein. The program primarily focuses on coverage of the Calgary Flames.

 Canucks Central at Noon 
CISL in Vancouver broadcasts Canucks Central at Noon, which is hosted by Scott Rintoul and Bik Nizzar, and focuses on the Vancouver Canucks.

 Personalities 
David Amber
Caroline Cameron
Christine Simpson
Jeff Marek
Anthony Stewart
Justin Bourne
Sam Cosentino
Elliotte Friedman
Jennifer Botterill
Cassie Campbell-Pascall
Anson Carter
Keith Yandle
Ron MacLean (Hockey Central Saturday only)
Kelly Hrudey (Hockey Central Saturday only)
Kevin Bieksa (Hockey Central Saturday only)

 Former personalities 
Greg Brady (Hockey Central at Noon only)
Mike Brophy
Chantal Desjardins (Canadiens Central only)
Glenn Healy
Leah Hextall (Hockey Central Alberta only)
Nick Kypreos
Pierre LeBrun
Doug MacLean
Daren Millard
John Shannon
P.J. Stock
George Stroumboulopoulos (Hockey Central Saturday only)

See also
 That's Hockey'', a competing program aired by TSN

References

External links
 Hockey Central Page
 Hockey Central at Noon page from Fan590.com

2000s Canadian sports television series
National Hockey League on television
National Hockey League on the radio
Sportsnet shows
2010s Canadian sports television series